Marija is a feminine given name, a variation of the name Maria, which was in turn a Latin form of the Greek names Μαριαμ, or Mariam, and Μαρια, or Maria, found in the New Testament. Depending on phonological rules concerning consecutive vowels or the use of the palatal approximant, "Mary" in these languages is Marija if consecutive vowels are disallowed and otherwise Maria.

Marija is the most common female name in Croatia. The name Marija was the most common feminine given name until 1969.

The male equivalents are Marijan, Marijo and Mario.

Notable people with the name include:
 Marija Agbaba, Serbian handball player
 Marija Bankauskaitė, Lithuanian ceramics artist
 Marija Bursać, Bosnian Serb Yugoslav resistance fighter
 Marija Čolić, Serbian handball player
 Marija Ćirović, Montenegrin model
 Marija Dūdienė, Lithuanian painter
 Marija Gimbutas, Lithuanian-American archaeologist
 Marija Gluvakov, Serbian pianist
 Marija Jovanović, Montenegrin handball player
 Marija Jurić Zagorka, Croatian writer
 Marija Karan, Serbian actress
 Marija Kessler, Slovenian salonist
 Marija Lastauskienė, Lithuanian writer
 Marija Leiko, Latvian actress
 Marija Lucija Stupica, Slovenian writer
 Marija Lugarić, Croatian politician
 Marija Makarovič, Slovene ethnologist
 Marija Mačiulienė, Lithuanian painter
 Marija Mirković, Serbian-Australian tennis player
 Marija Naumova, Latvian singer
 Marija Nikolova, Macedonian singer
 Marija Obrenović, Moldavian and Romanian aristocrat
 Marija Omaljev-Grbić, Croatian actress
 Marija Pečkauskaitė, Lithuanian writer under the pen name Šatrijos Ragana
 Marija Petković, Croatian nun
 Marija Šerifović, Serbian singer
 Marija Šestak, Slovenian triple jumper
 Marija Šestić, Bosnian Serb singer
 Marija Škaričić, Croatian actress
 Marija Trmčić, Serbian skier
 Marija Ugrica, Serbian singer
 Marija Ujević-Galetović, Croatian sculptor
 Marija Vojskovič, Slovene writer
 Marija Vujović, Montenegrin model
 Marija Vuković, Montenegrin athlete
 Marija Vukčević, Montenegrin football player
 Princess Marija of Yugoslavia, the only child of Prince Nikolas of Yugoslavia and Ljiljana Licanin
 Marija Zerova (1902–1994), Ukrainian mycologist

See also 
, a United States Navy patrol boat in commission from 1917 to 1922
Marija (film), a 2016 Swiss-German film

References

Given names
Slovene feminine given names
Croatian feminine given names
Serbian feminine given names
Lithuanian feminine given names
Latvian feminine given names